Albert Dauphin (26 August 1827 – 14 November 1898) was a French lawyer and politician. He served as a member of the National Assembly from 7 January 1872 to 1 March 1892, representing Somme. He also served in the French Senate from 1876 to 1898, representing Somme. He was the mayor of Amiens from 1868 to 1873. He was a commander of the Legion of Honour.

References

1827 births
1898 deaths
People from Amiens
French republicans
French Ministers of Finance
Members of the National Assembly (1871)
French Senators of the Third Republic
Senators of Somme (department)
Mayors of places in Hauts-de-France
Commandeurs of the Légion d'honneur